Oh, Daddy! is a 1935 British comedy film directed by Graham Cutts and Austin Melford and starring Leslie Henson, Frances Day, Robertson Hare, and Barry MacKay.

It was made at Islington Studios. The film's sets were designed by the art director Ernő Metzner.

Cast

See also
 The True Jacob (1931)
 One Night Apart (1950)
 The True Jacob (1960)

References

External links

Oh, Daddy! at BFI Database

1935 films
1935 comedy films
British comedy films
Films directed by Graham Cutts
British remakes of German films
British films based on plays
British black-and-white films
Films set in London
1930s English-language films
1930s British films